Adolf Weber (29 December 1876 – 5 January 1963) was a German economist.

Life
Adolf Weber was born at Mechernich near Bonn. He was professor at the University of Cologne, the University of Breslau, the University of Frankfurt and the University of Munich. Weber was a friend of Ludwig von Mises, and broadly associated with the Austrian School. He criticised the economic policy of Reichsbank president Hjalmar Schacht in an article 'Is Schacht right?'

Works
 Depositenbanken und Spekulationsbanken : ein Vergleich deutschen und englischen Bankwesens, 1902.
 Der Kampf zwischen Kapital und Arbeit; Gewerkschaften und Arbeitgeberverbände in Deutschland, 1920
 Allgemeine Volkswirtschaftslehre: eine Einführung, 1928.
 In defence of capitalism, 1930. Translated by H. J. Stenning from the German  Ende des Kapitalismus.
 Geld, Banken, Börsen, 1939.
 Deutsches wirtschaftsleben, 1941
 Kurzgefasste Volkswirtschaftspolitik, 1942.
 Weltwirtschaft, 1947.
 Marktwirtschaft und Sowjetwirtschaft; ein Vergleich, 1949.
 Sowjetwirtschaft und Weltwirtschaft, 1959

References

External links
 

1876 births
1963 deaths
Austrian School economists
German economists